Gregori Emilio Aquino Valera (born January 11, 1978) is a former professional baseball pitcher. He previously played for the Arizona Diamondbacks, Milwaukee Brewers, Baltimore Orioles, and Cleveland Indians.

Career

Arizona Diamondbacks

Aquino was originally signed as a 16-year-old infielder in 1995, by the Arizona Diamondbacks. After spending the next decade in the Diamondbacks' farm system, he made his major league debut on July 2, 2004, against the Minnesota Twins. That year, he was 0–2 with 16 saves and a 3.06 earned run average in 34 games. He then spent the following two seasons with the Diamondbacks.

Milwaukee Brewers

On November 25, 2006, Aquino was traded to the Milwaukee Brewers alongside catcher Johnny Estrada and pitcher Claudio Vargas in exchange for outfielder Dave Krynzel, and pitchers Doug Davis and Dana Eveland. Aquino began the  season on the Brewers roster, but was optioned to the Triple-A Nashville Sounds on April 21. He was later recalled by Milwaukee on August 31 to replace Manny Parra, who was placed on the disabled list. In 15 appearances with the Brewers, Aquino went 0–1 with a 4.50 ERA.

Baltimore Orioles

On December 14, 2007, Aquino was claimed off waivers by the Baltimore Orioles. After a poor performance in the first month of the  season, the Orioles designated Aquino for assignment on April 29, and he cleared waivers and was assigned to Triple-A on May 1. He became a free agent at the end of the season.

Cleveland Indians

Aquino signed a minor league contract with the Cleveland Indians on January 14, 2009. He attended Indians spring training in 2009 but was sent to Minor League camp on March 24, 2009. In October 2009, Aquino was granted free agency.

Chicago White Sox

On December 14, 2009, Aquino signed a minor league contract with the Chicago White Sox. He became a free agent after the 2010 season.

Sultanes de Monterrey

On June 7, 2011, Aquino signed with the Sultanes de Monterrey of the Mexican Baseball League. He was released on June 10, 2011.

Guerreros de Oaxaca

On June 20, 2011, Aquino signed with the Guerreros de Oaxaca of the Mexican Baseball League. He was released on July 26, 2011.

Sugar Land Skeeters

On April 19, 2013, Aquino signed with the Sugar Land Skeeters of the Atlantic League of Professional Baseball. He became a free agent at the end of the season.

References

External links

1978 births
Living people
Aberdeen IronBirds players
Arizona Diamondbacks players
Baltimore Orioles players
Bowie Baysox players
Cleveland Indians players
Delmarva Shorebirds players
Dominican Republic expatriate baseball players in Mexico
Dominican Republic expatriate baseball players in the United States
El Paso Diablos players
Frederick Keys players
Guerreros de Oaxaca players
Lancaster JetHawks players

Major League Baseball pitchers
Major League Baseball players from the Dominican Republic
Mexican League baseball pitchers
Milwaukee Brewers players
Nashville Sounds players
Norfolk Tides players
People from San Cristóbal Province
Sugar Land Skeeters players
Sultanes de Monterrey players
Tucson Sidewinders players
Yakima Bears players